Mohamed Hamza (born 11 September 2000) is an Egyptian fencer and student at Princeton University. He competed for Egypt in both the men's team foil event at the 2016 Summer Olympics and men's foil individual and team events at the 2020 Summer Olympics.

He won one of the bronze medals in the men's individual foil event at the 2022 Mediterranean Games held in Oran, Algeria.

References

2000 births
Living people
Sportspeople from Houston
Egyptian male foil fencers
Olympic fencers of Egypt
Fencers at the 2016 Summer Olympics
Fencers at the 2020 Summer Olympics
African Games medalists in fencing
African Games gold medalists for Egypt
African Games bronze medalists for Egypt
Competitors at the 2019 African Games
American people of Egyptian descent
Mediterranean Games bronze medalists for Egypt
Competitors at the 2022 Mediterranean Games
Mediterranean Games medalists in fencing
21st-century Egyptian people